The 2022 Women's FIH Hockey World Cup was the 15th edition of the Women's FIH Hockey World Cup, the quadrennial world championship for women's national field hockey teams organized by the International Hockey Federation. It was held from 1 to 17 July 2022 at the Estadi Olímpic de Terrassa in Terrassa, Spain and at the Wagener Stadium in Amstelveen, the Netherlands.

Defending champions the Netherlands won the tournament for a record ninth time after defeating Argentina 3–1 in the final. Australia won the third place match by defeating Germany 2–1.

Host selection
The International Hockey Federation announced in December 2018 that the 2022 FIH Hockey World Cups will be held either in July 2022 or January 2023. The FIH received the following final five bids for the Women's 2022 World Cup. In November 2019, it was announced that Spain and the Netherlands would host the tournament in July 2022.

For the preferred time window 1–17 July 2022:
Germany
Netherlands & Spain
Spain

For the preferred time window 13–29 January 2023:
Australia (withdrew)
India (withdrew)
Malaysia
New Zealand

Qualification
Just as in 2018, 16 teams competed in the tournament. Alongside the hosts, Spain and the Netherlands, the five continental champions received an automatic berth. After the postponement of the 2020 Summer Olympics the quota of places available through continental championships including the World Cup hosts was increased from six to sixteen.

Venues
Following is a list of all venues and host cities.

Draw
The draw took place on 17 February 2022.

Seeding
As the hosts, Netherlands and Spain played in their countries until the quarter-final. Therefore, they were allocated in different sides of the pools but in the rows corresponding to their World Ranking. Based on that ranking, Netherlands was positioned as A1 and Spain as C2. The top four teams according to the world ranking and qualified to the event were allocated in the first row as the headers of each pool.

Squads

Umpires
On 29 November 2021, 18 umpires were appointed by the FIH for this tournament.

Amber Church (NZL)
Laurine Delforge (BEL)
Maggie Giddens (USA)
Hannah Harrison (ENG)
Kelly Hudson (NZL)
Kang Hyun-young (KOR)
Alison Keogh (IRL)
Ivona Makar (CRO)
Ayanna McClean (TTO)
Michelle Meister (GER)
Catalina Montesino (CHI)
Aleisha Neumann (AUS)
Irene Presenqui (ARG)
Annelize Rostron (RSA)
Cookie Tan (SGP)
Wanri Venter (RSA)
Sarah Wilson (SCO)
Emi Yamada (JPN)

First round
The match schedule was announced on 3 December 2020.

All times are local (UTC+2).

Pool A

Pool B

Pool C

Pool D

Classification

9–16th place quarterfinals

13–16th place classification

9–12th place classification

Second round

Bracket

Cross-overs

Quarter-finals

Semi-finals

Third place match

Final

Final standings

Goalscorers

Awards
The awards were announced on 17 July 2022.

See also
2022 Women's FIH Indoor Hockey World Cup
2022 Women's FIH Hockey Junior World Cup
2023 Men's FIH Hockey World Cup

Notes

References

External links
Official website

 
Women's Hockey World Cup
World Cup
International women's field hockey competitions hosted by the Netherlands
International women's field hockey competitions hosted by Catalonia
Hockey World Cup
Hockey World Cup
Sport in Terrassa
Sports competitions in Amstelveen
FIH Hockey World Cup
FIH Hockey World Cup